Port Curtis was an electoral district of the Legislative Assembly in the Australian state of Queensland from 1860 to 1992.

The district was named after the harbour at Port Curtis, and centred on the regional city of Gladstone. In 1992, it was renamed Gladstone.

Members for Port Curtis

Election results

See also
 Electoral districts of Queensland
 Members of the Queensland Legislative Assembly by year
 :Category:Members of the Queensland Legislative Assembly by name

References

Former electoral districts of Queensland
1860 establishments in Australia
1992 disestablishments in Australia
Constituencies established in 1860
Constituencies disestablished in 1992